Steve Hagen (born September 15, 1961) is an American football coach. He served as an assistant coach for the Cleveland Browns and New York Jets.

Hagen has coached football in Ohio, California, North Carolina, Arizona, Illinois, Indiana, Nevada, Kansas, Iowa, and in New Jersey. As of 2013, he has held sixteen jobs at twelve colleges and with two NFL teams.

In 2019, he became tight ends coach and special teams assistant for the Seattle Dragons of the XFL.

Head coaching record

References

1961 births
Living people
Cal Lutheran Kingsmen football players
California Golden Bears football coaches
Cleveland Browns coaches
Fresno State Bulldogs football coaches
Illinois Fighting Illini football coaches
Kansas Jayhawks football coaches
Kent State Golden Flashes football coaches
New York Jets coaches
North Carolina Tar Heels football coaches
Northern Arizona Lumberjacks football coaches
Notre Dame Fighting Irish football coaches
Nevada Wolf Pack football coaches
San Jose State Spartans football coaches
Seattle Dragons coaches
UNLV Rebels football coaches
Wartburg Knights football coaches